Cartoon Network, commonly abbreviated as CN, is a Portuguese digital cable and satellite television channel launched on 3 December 2013 and is owned by Warner Bros. Discovery under its International division.

Currently, Cartoon Network is the second most-watched kids and teens' channel in Portugal, recently surpassing Canal Panda and is now only behind Disney Channel.

History
The Pan-European feed received in Portugal, Angola and Mozambique was transmitted for a long time (from 17 September 1993 to 3 December 2013), this feed is now Cartoon Network Africa.

The Portuguese-language version of the channel was first launched on 1 October 2013 in Angola and Mozambique.

On 3 December 2013, the Portuguese channel was officially launched in Portugal on all cable operators, switching from the Pan-European version (in English). at 20:00, broadcasting in 16:9. The Pan-European English feed was removed from the ZON (currently NOS) basic cable service, along with other foreign language international channels on 1 February 2010, and the Portuguese-language Panda Biggs was included in its place.

When the Pan-European feed was still being broadcast, the daily broadcast was 15 hours (from 05:00 to 20:00) in Portugal. During that time, the channel shared time with TNT, focusing on classic movies and professional wrestling, and in its final years, with Turner Classic Movies. Some cable TV operators preferred dividing the two channels with their own dchannel (some with a description of their opening and closing times). Shortly after the release of Portugal's version of the channel, TCM and Boomerang stopped being aired in Portugal.

Around February 2014, the channel started airing advertisements, but in March 2014, they stopped airing them, returning in the middle of the month.

Cartoon Network Portugal was also the first European CN feed to adopt the CHECK it 3.0 branding.

From 30 May 2014 to 30 March 2017, Cartoon Network used white background graphics. On 31 March 2017, it changed its design to a version based on the US feed's Dimensional branding.

On 26 April 2018, Boomerang Portugal was launched on NOWO and Vodafone. This version had already been launched in Angola and Mozambique on 21 April 2015 and the European channel (English-language) stopped being broadcast when Cartoon Network was launched in Portuguese.

Programming

Current programming

Specials

Former programming

See also

 Hanna-Barbera
 Turner Entertainment
 Warner Bros. Animation

References

External links
 

Children's television networks
Cartoon Network
Turner Broadcasting System Europe
Turner Broadcasting System Portugal
Television stations in Portugal
Television channels and stations established in 2013
Television stations in Angola
Television channels in Mozambique